T. plicata may refer to:
 Terebra plicata, a sea snail species
 Thuja plicata, the Western redcedar, an evergreen coniferous tree species native to western North America
 Tiquilia plicata, the fanleaf crinklemat, a perennial, subshrub-like plant species found in the southwestern United States and Northern Mexico

See also
 Plicata (disambiguation)